Ladson Presbyterian Church is a historic African American Presbyterian church located at 1720 Sumter Street in Columbia, South Carolina.  The religious building was initially a chapel founded in 1838 and, rebuilt in 1896, and is a one-story-over-raised-basement, rectangular red brick building in the Renaissance Revival style.  It has a front gable roof and features two brick entrance towers. The congregation was founded in 1838, as an offshoot congregation of the First Presbyterian Church.

It was added to the National Register of Historic Places in 1998.

References

African-American history of South Carolina
Presbyterian churches in South Carolina
Churches on the National Register of Historic Places in South Carolina
Renaissance Revival architecture in South Carolina
Churches completed in 1896
19th-century Presbyterian church buildings in the United States
Churches in Columbia, South Carolina
National Register of Historic Places in Columbia, South Carolina